The following is a list of examples of various types of Baroque architecture since its origins.

See also 
 List of Baroque residences

Architecture lists